Zgornje Laze is a settlement in the Municipality of Gorje in the Upper Carniola region of Slovenia.

References

External links
Zgornje Laze at Geopedia

Populated places in the Municipality of Gorje